So Damn Happy is the third live album by American singer-songwriter Loudon Wainwright III, released on August 19, 2003 on Sanctuary Records. The album was recorded at Largo in West Hollywood, California, and features, amongst others, Van Dyke Parks, Richard Thompson and Martha Wainwright.

So Damn Happy compiles mostly nineties-era Wainwright songs, particularly from Grown Man, and new songs.

Regarding So Damn Happy'''s lighter tone, in comparison to previous release, Last Man on Earth'', Loudon states that:

Track listing
"Much Better Bets"  – 3:05
"So Damn Happy"  – 2:54
"Between"  – 1:23
"The Picture"  – 2:48
"Cobwebs"  – 3:09
"Heaven"  – 2:52
"Something for Nothing"  – 4:10
"Dreaming"  – 4:05
"Westchester County"  – 4:20
"Tonya's Twirls"  – 4:47
"A Year"  – 3:37
"You Never Phone" (with Martha Wainwright) – 3:06
"4 X 10"  – 2:26
"The Sh*t Song"  – 4:18
"Primrose Hill"  – 4:17
"The Home Stretch"  – 5:09
"Men"  – 3:36

References

Release history
CD: Sanctuary 06076-84627-2

Loudon Wainwright III live albums
2003 live albums
Sanctuary Records live albums